Pichqa Pukyu (Quechua pichqa five, pukyu spring, well, "five springs (or wells)", hispanicized spelling Pichgapuquio) is a mountain in the Andes of Peru, about  high. It is located in the Pasco Region, Pasco Province,  Huariaca District.

References

Mountains of Peru
Mountains of Pasco Region